Simon Agoston (born 5 April 1977) is a Hungarian-born triathlete from Austria, who competed at the 2008 Summer Olympics in Beijing. Agoston started out his triathlon career in 1995, and has participated in over fifty competitions in Europe. His best result came at the 2000 Triathlon World University Championships in Tiszaújváros, Hungary, where he finished strongly in second place. At the Olympics, Agoston placed thirty-eighth in the men's triathlon with a time of 1:53:23, just five minutes behind the winner.

References

External links
ITU Profile

1977 births
Living people
Triathletes at the 2008 Summer Olympics
Olympic triathletes of Austria
People from Békéscsaba
Austrian male triathletes